Republic Plaza is a skyscraper in Downtown Core, Singapore. It formerly shared the title of "tallest building" with the One Raffles Place and UOB Plaza, until the completion of Tanjong Pagar Centre in 2016. At a height of 280 meters, it was officially opened on 18 January 1998 and incorporates earthquake proof features despite the city being relatively far from earthquake zones.

Designed by Kisho Kurokawa, the building was constructed by Shimizu Corporation. The building is owned and operated by City Developments Limited.

Architecture

A simple square form with chamfered corners at the base was adopted for the design of the tower, with the main entrance at D'Almeida Street. The tower tapers as it rises, forming some triangular elements, to reduce buffeting due to strong winds and improve wind loading. As with many other towers, it consists of a central core containing basic functions such as emergency stairways and elevator shafts, wrapped around by lettable office space.

Other items particular to the building:
The tower is turned 45 degrees from the axis of the ground floor level to maintain sea views from the upper floors.
The building has 15 double-decker vertical lifts.
The tower was designed to reflect a subtle Oriental influence.
The main lobby is four storeys high, finished in polished granite and ceramics.
The lobby is framed by concrete-filled tubular steel columns.
The exterior façade transitions from granite with strip windows to tinted wall glass, smoothly inclining from an octagonal base to a square top.
The tower rose rapidly despite building complications which included an MRT line beside the site, historically important buildings nearby, as well as natural boulders and abandoned piles underground.
The tower was built on a caisson with more than 900 mini piles.
The construction was completed in just under two years using the fast track process.
A total of 8,600 tons of structural steel and 31,000 cubic metres of concrete was used.
After nightfall, only the glass top is visible when it is lit from within.
Office Lettable Area: 
Retail Lettable Area:

See also
 List of tallest buildings in Singapore

References

Office buildings completed in 1995
City Developments Limited
Raffles Place
Skyscraper office buildings in Singapore
Downtown Core (Singapore)
Kisho Kurokawa buildings
Shimizu Corporation
20th-century architecture in Singapore